The 2022 African Nations Championship Final was a football match played between Senegal and Algeria at the Nelson Mandela Stadium in Algiers, Algeria on 4 February 2023 to determine the winners of the 7th edition of the biennial African international football tournament reserved for players playing in their local leagues.

Senegal defeated Algeria 5-4 on penalties to win the Championship.

Venue

The local CHAN organizing committee in Algeria chose the newly-built and newly-inaugurated Nelson Mandela Stadium in the nation's capital city Algiers as the venue for both the opening match and the final. Inaugurated a week before the start of this edition of the tournament, this 40,784-seater stadium primarily hosts football matches and is named after anti-apartheid hero and former South African president, Nelson Mandela.

Background
The African Nations Championship or the Championship of African Nations, abbreviated as CHAN, is the biennial African international football tournament reserved for players playing in the league of their birth nations. The 2022 edition or 7th edition of this tournament, colloquially referred to for short as the 2023 CHAN, was staged in Algeria with this concluding match of this edition.

Route to the final

Match

Summary

Details

Statistics

See also
2022 African Nations Championship

Notes

References

External links
Detailed report of the final at CAFOnline.com

2022
Final
Algeria national football team matches
Senegal national football team matches
African Nations Championship Final
African Nations Championship Final 2022